Robert "Rab Roy" Gaston (March 19, 1910 – February 11, 2000) was an American baseball catcher in the Negro leagues. He played from 1932 to 1948, mostly with the Homestead Grays. He spent the majority of his career as the backup catcher to Josh Gibson.

References

External links
 and Seamheads
Negro League Baseball Players Association

1910 births
2000 deaths
Homestead Grays players
Baseball players from Tennessee
20th-century African-American sportspeople
Baseball catchers